Westport Airport may refer to:

 Westport Airport (New Zealand) in Westport, New Zealand (IATA: WSZ)
 Westport Airport (Kansas) in Wichita, Kansas, United States (FAA: 71K)
 Westport Airport (Oklahoma) in Westport, Oklahoma, United States (FAA: 4F1)
 Westport Airport (Washington) in Westport, Washington, United States (FAA: 14S)